In mathematics, the axiom of real determinacy (abbreviated as ADR) is an axiom in set theory. It states the following:

The axiom of real determinacy is a stronger version of the axiom of determinacy (AD), which makes the same statement about games where both players choose integers; ADR is inconsistent with the axiom of choice. It also implies the existence of inner models with certain large cardinals.

ADR is equivalent to AD plus the axiom of uniformization.

See also 
 AD+
 Axiom of projective determinacy
 Topological game

Axioms of set theory
Determinacy